The English National Badminton Championships is a tournament organised by the Badminton England to crown the best badminton players in England.

The tournament started in 1964 and is held annually. The first winners were Bill Havers and Ursula Smith in 1964. Darren Hall has won the most singles titles with 10, whilst Gillian Gilks and Julia Mann both have eight women's singles titles.

Past winners

Multiple titles (6 or more)

Men

Women

References

External links
Official website

Recurring sporting events established in 1964
National championships in England
National badminton championships
1964 establishments in England